Kadipikonda is a municipal corporation of 44 & 45th Division in Hanamkonda district, Telangana, India. It is located near the Kazipet railway junction.

Demographics of Kadipikonda
Telugu is the Local Language here. The total population of Kadipikonda (CT) is 8,685 according to census 2011. Among them Males are 4,313 and Females are 4,372 living in Houses. Of these, 5,965 are literate. There are 806 children below 6 years. All the numbers are according to the 2011 census.

Transport

Rail
Kazipet Jn Rail Way Station, Kazipet Town Rail Way Station are the very nearby railway stations to Kadipikonda.

Education
Colleges near Kadipikonda

Pulipatiprasad Ovc Jr College
Address : 1-8-524/3 Kandi Complex Opp:s.b.h Nakkalagutta Hanamkonda
Sri Arunodaya Coop Jr Col Hanamkonda
Address :
Govt Pingali Women's Jr Col Hanamkonda
Address :
St Joseph S Girls Jr Coll Hanamkonda
Address :
Sri Vikas Jr Clg, vijayatalkies Rd, hanamkonda
Address : Vijayatalkies Rd;hanamkonda
Schools in Kadipikonda

St. George High School
Address : kadipikonda, hanamkonda, warangal, Andhra Pradesh. PIN- 506003, Post - Kazipet

Viswashanti High School
Address : kadipikonda, hanamkonda, warangal, Andhra Pradesh. PIN- 506003, Post - Kazipet

Zphs Kadipikonda
Address : kadipikonda, hanamkonda, warangal, Andhra Pradesh. PIN- 506003, Post - Kazipet

Universal Innovative School
Address : kadipikonda, hanamkonda, warangal, Andhra Pradesh. PIN- 506003, Post - Kazipet

Sri Vivekananda Ups
Address : kadipikonda, hanamkonda, warangal, Andhra Pradesh. PIN- 506003, Post - Kazipet

References

Villages in Hanamkonda district